La Garenne-Colombes is a commune in the northwestern suburbs of Paris, France. It is one of the most densely populated municipalities in Europe.

Name
The city used to be part of the neighbouring city of Colombes. At this time, before 1910, it was called "La Garenne de Colombes," which means "Colombes' Garenne." "Garenne" is French for "warren." So the English for "La Garenne-Colombes" could be "Colombes' warren" or "Warren of Colombes"; yet to speakers of all languages the name of the city is officially "La Garenne-Colombes."

The explanation for the city being called "warren" is that it used to be a warren where people would hunt. But this dates back to the French monarchy, in the 18th century and before.

Geography
La Garenne-Colombes is usually simply called "La Garenne", and nicknamed "petit Neuilly".

Surroundings
Four towns surround La Garenne-Colombes: Colombes (North), Bois-Colombes (East), Courbevoie (South) and Nanterre (West). The city is quite small compared with the other cities in the Hauts-de-Seine, it is more or less as small as the first arrondissement of Paris. Very close to La Garenne-Colombes are La Défense and the Île de la Jatte island (Bowl Island).

Transportation
La Garenne-Colombes is served by two stations on the Transilien Paris – Saint-Lazare suburban rail line: La Garenne-Colombes and Les Vallées (this last station is located at the border between the commune of La Garenne-Colombes and the commune of Bois-Colombes, with a postal address in La Garenne-Colombes). The train has been used there since 1837.

The two stations directly join Paris's most important urban station (Gare Saint-Lazare) in 10 minutes and the largest university in Paris (Paris Ouest La Défense University, Western Paris University La Défense) in 2 minutes.

In 1935, five Tramway lines crossed La Garenne-Colombes.

Many RATP Bus lines also cross the city: lines 73, 161, 163, 164, 176, 178, 262, 272, 278, 358 and 378.

Two RATP Noctilien night Bus lines cross the city: N24 and N152.

In 2012, the line 2 of the Parisian Tramway will cross La Garenne-Colombes, with two stations: Les Fauvelles (French for Wildcats) and Charlebourg. To join the center of the CBD, 2 to 4 minutes will be required by tramway.

History
It was named in 1240 as "La Garenne dépendant de Colombes" ("La Garenne depending on Colombes"). After the Bourbon Restoration in 1815, the estate was bought by Peter Urban Sartoris, a Genevois banker who had lived in London for many years. On his death in 1833 it was inherited by his 6 children, who urbanised it and named the rue Sartoris. They sold the last of their interests in 1865.

The commune of La Garenne-Colombes was created on 2 May 1910 by detaching its territory from the commune of Colombes.

Demography

As the commune's territory is entirely built up, population can only grow if buildings are demolished and replaced by bigger buildings for more people (higher, less gardens). Thereby the population will grow certainly over the 30,000 after many reconstructions in the "Champs-Philippe" neighbourhood, with a density over 17,000 inhabitants per square kilometres (43,855 inhabitants per square miles).

According to statistics, La Garenne-Colombes is an average city of the Hauts-de-Seine department (Paris region), which is one of the richest places in Europe.

Economy

The landscape looks like an American CBD (Central Business District). But this is in the suburbs of Paris, which do not look like the downtown Paris districts surrounding the Eiffel Tower or the Champs-Elysées. Paradoxically, the most advanced part of the city of Paris, geographically speaking, is on the outskirts of the city itself.

There used to be many workshops in La Garenne-Colombes, as in a large part of the Hauts-de-Seine department. Today, it is mainly a residential city. However, some 1200 business units are there.

Tertiary activity

The service industry is paramount in the economy of La Garenne-Colombes. The proximity of La Défense increases this phenomenon. There is :

 Peugeot study offices
 Boston Scientific International
 RATP's Charlebourg center

The arrival of the Tramway in 2012 resulted in a redevelopment of a part of the city, and should bring a new breath of life to the local economy.

Urbanism

The city

In spite of the proximity of La Défense and Paris which has applied a strong pressure, no big buildings were built in La Garenne. Residential buildings (detached homes and apartment buildings) account for the majority of the building stock in La Garenne-Colombes.  Many of these buildings were constructed in the early 1900s. In a large part of the town, new construction is limited to 4 floors.

The neighbourhood of the place de Belgique and National boulevard, which is the entry of La Défense, is being redeveloped.

Green ways
Eight green ways are in La Garenne-Colombes, exactly:
 two public squares
 two gardens
 four parks

Commonly known places

 Place de la Liberté (Freedom square), known under the name of place du marché (market) or place de l'Eglise (church)
 Place du Général Leclerc, known under the name of place de la Fontaine (Fountain plaza)
 Place de Belgique (Belgium square)
 Rond-point du Souvenir français, known under the name of place Jean Baillet
 Rond-point de l'Europe (Europe's plaza)

Politics and administration

List of mayors

Twin towns - sister cities
La Garenne-Colombes is twinned with:
 Wangen im Allgäu, Germany
 Yokneam Illit, Israel
 Harissa-Daraoun, Lebanon
 Valpaços, Portugal

Education

The commune has four public preschools and five public elementary schools
 Primary schools: René Guest, André Marsault, Ernest Renan (built in 1905), Sainte Geneviève, Sagot Voltaire
 Junior high school: Les Vallées
 Junior high school: Champs-Philippe (previously named Kleber Haedens, the name was revoked by the Hauts-de-Seine general council due to Haedens having been a nazi collaborationist)
 Vocational senior high school: Lycée La Tournelle

Students wishing to attend a general high school may go to Lycée Albert-Camus in Bois-Colombes or Lycée Paul-Lapie in Courbevoie.

The city owns a castle in Normandy where students are sometimes sent for class-holidays.

Life in La Garenne-Colombes

According to statistics published by the Figaro newspaper, La Garenne-Colombes is the Hauts-de-Seine's city with the lowest crime rate, without forgetting that the Hauts-de-Seine is a very quiet part of the Paris region.

Personalities

Born in La Garenne-Colombes
 Guy-Elphege Anouman (1994), athlete
 Patrick Chesnais (1947), French actor
 Émilie Lepennec (1987), French gymnast
 Fernand Oury (1920), French pedagogue and creator of modern French schooling
 Catherine Picard (1952), French politician
 Steven Nzonzi (1988), French soccer player

Lived in La Garenne-Colombes
 William Klein, American painter, film-maker and photographer
 Cédric Mongongu, Footballer
 Deng Xiaoping, Chinese political leader

Died in La Garenne-Colombes
 Jean Mitry (1907–1988), French film theorist, critic and filmmaker

See also
Communes of the Hauts-de-Seine department

References

External links

Communes of Hauts-de-Seine